Skateboarding made its debut appearance at the 2020 Summer Olympics in 2021 in Tokyo, Japan. It has also been provisionally approved by the IOC for inclusion at the 2024 Olympic Games in Paris.

World Skate currently sanctions Olympic skateboarding.

Bid for inclusion
In September 2015, skateboarding was included in a shortlist along with baseball, softball, karate, surfing, and sport climbing to be considered for inclusion in the 2020 Summer Olympics; and in June 2016, the Executive Board of the International Olympic Committee (IOC) announced that they would support the proposal to include all of the shortlisted sports in the 2020 Games. Finally, on August 3, 2016, all five sports (counting baseball and softball together as one sport) were approved for inclusion in the 2020 Olympic program. One of the biggest obstacles for skateboarding for an inclusion at the Olympics was that huge injuries in skateboarding were so risky (which can include death) and the IOC was less likely to take liabilities. Also the skateboarding sub-culture helped push the idea that the Olympic Games were too "mainstream" for the sport, and as a result skateboarding organizations did not campaign heavily to put the sport in the Olympic Games.

Events

2020

Medalists

Medal table
Sources:

References

External links
 Video - Full Replay: Olympic Games Tokyo 2020 Women's Street First Skateboarding Contest (olympics.com, IOC, OBS, english)
 Video - Full Replay: Olympic Games Tokyo 2020 Men's Street First Skateboarding Contest (olympics.com, IOC, OBS, english)
 Video - Full Replay: Olympic Games Tokyo 2020 Women's Park First Skateboarding Contest (olympics.com, IOC, OBS, english)
 Video - Full Replay: Olympic Games Tokyo 2020 Men's Park First Skateboarding Contest (olympics.com, IOC, OBS, english)
Skateboarding at tokyo2020.org

 
Sports at the Summer Olympics
Skateboarding competitions